The greenhouse of a vehicle is the “glassed” area above the fender line.  This comprises the windshield, rear and side windows, and, incidentally, any pillars separating them.  

The shape and position of the greenhouse have a defining influence on the looks and functionality of the car, and are a prime factor in differentiating between body styles such as saloon/sedan, coupé, estate/wagon and hatchback. A greenhouse with noticeably inward side slopes is also referred to as the tumblehome.

In the 2000s and 2010s, greenhouses have become narrower because of design trends and crash regulations.

References

Further reading 
Eckermann, Erik (2001). World history of the automobile, SAE,  

Automotive styling features
Automotive body parts
Car windows